The Atlantic Lottery Corporation (ALC) (French: Société des loteries de l'Atlantique), branded as simply Atlantic Lottery or Loto Atlantique, is a Canadian organization that provides government-regulated and responsible lottery products in Atlantic Canada. They offer a wide range of games, from draw games to online bingo; breakopen tickets to sports wagering; and games in both social settings and online.

Atlantic Lottery is owned jointly by the four Atlantic provincial governments: New Brunswick, Prince Edward Island, Nova Scotia and Newfoundland and Labrador, with 100 per cent of profits returned to the four Atlantic provinces each and every year to help fund essential services like health care, education and infrastructure.

Atlantic Lottery's head office is located in Moncton, New Brunswick, with regional offices in Halifax, Nova Scotia and St. John's, Newfoundland and Labrador. Prince Edward Island is home to Atlantic Lottery's Red Shores Racetrack and Casino in Charlottetown, and Red Shores at Summerside Raceway. 

Atlantic Lottery has achieved Level 4 Recertification under the World Lottery Association (WLA) Responsible Gaming Framework. This is the highest level available to a lottery under the framework, which the organization has maintained since 2010.

History 

ALC was founded in 1976, shortly after the founding of government lotteries elsewhere in Canada. The first and only game offered at this time was A-1, a $1 game sold in books of five, with draws occurring biweekly. While Atlantic Lottery’s first games were only available on a regional basis, it quickly joined the Interprovincial Lottery Corporation, which offered national draws.

In 1977, ALC began a long history of supporting causes throughout the region by sponsoring the Canada Games – a sponsorship that continues to this day. 

In 1987, Atlantic Lottery was the first lottery organization in the world to print a bar code on all draw and scratch tickets, allowing for instant verification of a prize. In 1990, they introduced the first regulated video lottery terminals in Canada.

By 2002, Atlantic Lottery had implemented responsible gaming features on all video lottery terminals. With responsible gaming as one of Atlantic Lottery’s core values, these features help players make informed decisions when they play.

Atlantic Lottery made history once again in 2004 with the introduction of PlaySphere, making them the first lottery jurisdiction in North America to offer lottery products online. PlaySphere has since been rebranded as alc.ca.

From 2004-06, Atlantic Lottery was named one of Canada's Top 100 Employers, as published in Maclean's magazine, the only provincial gaming authority to receive this honour.

The Charlottetown Driving Park Entertainment Centre (now the Red Shores Racetrack and Casino) first opened their doors in 2005, offering harness racing, a gaming floor and an unforgettable dining experience.

In 2012, Atlantic Lottery launched an Employee Social Responsibility certification program, becoming the first lottery in the world to launch an internal SR certification program. By 2014, the World Lottery Association recognized Atlantic Lottery for the “Best Innovation in Responsible Gaming”.

Highly committed to Diversity and Inclusion, Atlantic Lottery became a member of the Canadian Centre for Diversity and Inclusion (CCDI) in 2016.

In the same year, the company also renewed their World Lottery Association Level 4 International Responsible Gaming Accreditation and implemented an Enterprise Risk Management program.

Since its inception in 1976, Atlantic Lottery has awarded more than $5.5 billion in prizes and returned over $10.6 billion in profits to the four Atlantic Provinces. In 2019-20, $395.4 million in profit was returned to Atlantic Canada to help fund essential services like health care, education and infrastructure.

Games and products 

 Draw Games:
 Lotto 6/49 (national) — draws on Wednesdays and Saturdays
 Lotto Max (national) — draws on Tuesdays and Fridays
 Daily Grand (national) – draws on Mondays and Thursdays
 Atlantic 49 (regional) – draws on Wednesdays and Saturdays  
 Hit or Miss (regional) – a daily draw game that includes an instant win component
 Tag (regional) – an add-on game purchased with other draw tickets
 Keno Atlantic (regional) -a daily keno game where players can choose their wager
 Bucko (regional) – a daily 5/41 draw game that costs only $1 to play
 Salsa Bingo (regional) - a daily bingo draw game
 Poker Lotto (regional) – a daily draw game
 Lotto 4 (regional) – a daily draw game where players can choose their wager

 Sports betting:
 Pro-Line

 Other conventional games:
 Scratch-n-Win (national and regional scratch tickets, including popular games such as Set For Life, Crossword and Bingo)
 Breakopen (Pull-tabs)
 Video lottery terminals

 Internet-based games:
 alc.ca - a large variety of Atlantic Lottery’s games are available to purchase and play online

Red Shores 
Red Shores offers only Casino on Prince Edward Island, with the Racetrack and Casino at Charlottetown Driving Park offering over 150 slots, Blackjack, UTH, Baccarat, Roulette and a private Poker Room. Red Shores Summerside location offers a gaming floor with a mix of slots and VLT’s.

Red Shores Charlottetown and Summerside showcase a major part of P.E.I.’s heritage – harness racing. Thanks to a partnership with Bell Aliant, harness racing and other live events are livestreamed for fans around the world to enjoy. Live streaming broadcasts begin approximately 15 minutes prior to first race Post Time.

Major sponsorships
Atlantic Lottery sponsors more than 100 community festivals and events across the region every year that celebrate the culture and experiences that make Atlantic Canada unique.

In 2020, the COVID-19 pandemic caused most community festivals and events to be cancelled, meaning Atlantic Lottery’s sponsorship program would not look the same. As an alternative, the company launched the Community Proud Contest, which asked Atlantic Canadians to nominate charitable organizations in their communities who they felt were doing important work. Three winners in each Atlantic province were selected randomly to receive a one-time donation of $5,000.

Atlantic Lottery Corporation has supported the Canada Games for over four decades – beginning in 1977 when ALC provided sports bags to every Atlantic Canadian athlete. The company continues to partner with Canada Games and will be a major sponsor of the 2023 Canada Winter Games in Prince Edward Island.

With a commitment to charitable and not-for-profit support, Atlantic Lottery is a significant contributor to United Way and its agencies across Atlantic Canada, in additional to many other charitable organizations.

References

External links 
 Atlantic Lottery Corporation

Lotteries in Canada
Organizations based in Moncton
Lottery monopolies